Murin may refer to 
Murin (surname)
Murin, Idlib, a village in Syria
Morrin, Iran, a village in Iran
Murin-an, a garden in Kyoto, Japan
Šoldra, an Easter bread from Silesian cuisine

See also
Morrin (disambiguation)